Borrowing Matchsticks is a Soviet–Finnish comedy film produced by Mosfilm and Suomifilm in 1980. Film based on the novel by Algot Untola.

Plot 
Antti Ihalainen (Yevgeny Leonov) lives happily on the farm with his wife Anna-Lisa (Rita Polster). Once, when the house ran out of matches and the Ihalainens had nothing to make a fire for cooking coffee so loved by the Finns, Anna-Lisa sent her husband to a neighbor Hyvärinen (Sergei Filippov) for matches.

On the way Ihalainen meets an old friend Jussi Vatanen (Vyacheslav Nevinny). Widower Jussi asks Ihalainen woo him Hyvärinen's daughter Anna-Kaisa (Vera Ivleva). When they came to visit Hyvärinen, Antti praised his friend for a long time ("the meat in the house Vatanen is never depleted, even in summer") and finally uttered the sacred words: "And why not Anna-Kaisa to marry Jussi Vatanen?". The Hyvärinens were enthusiastic about this idea. Antti had forgotten what was the original purpose of his visit to the Hyvärinens.

Meanwhile, tailor Tahvo Kennonen (Georgy Vitsin) from a nearby town in a drunken conversation with a customer tells that long ago he liked Anna-Lisa, but Antti Ihalainen got ahead of him. Tahvo Kennonen plans to see his old sweetheart.

Ihalainen between said Jussi successful courtship, and the friends decide to go into the city – to buy gifts for the bride's family, including grain spirit (vodka) for the old man Hyvärinen. In order to avoid buying a new bottle of this product, Jussi found an old one in the attic.

The friends Antti and Jussi themselves for 10 years as a "tied" to drink, because 10 years before, being drunk, they fought with a miller, broke four ribs, and then for every broken miller's rib the friends had to give him a cow. Since then, they quit drinking.

Sadly, the bottle wasn't empty. Although Jussi suggested to "pour this stuff," two friends drank it and then went to town drunk. Got to meet them tailor Tahvo Kenonen they intimidated and nearly beat him. Known gossiper Ville Huttunen (Olavi Ahonen), who also caught them on the road, they jokingly said that they were going to America. Ville Huttunen was quick to spread the news throughout the district. The rumor came to the ears, and Anna-Lisa, who has already begun to worry about why the husband is not so long back from the neighbors. And inspired by this news Tahvo Kennonen in a hurry to make a marriage proposal, "the rest of the widow" Anna-Lisa. At this time, Antti and Jussi, arriving in the city, it is not in a hurry to go home. When Ihalainen finally returned, and saw his wife's new husband, that it came out sideways ...

Cast 
 Yevgeny Leonov (Antti Ihalainen)
 Vyacheslav Nevinny (Jussi Vatanen)
 Georgy Vitsin (Tahvo Kennonen)
 Rita Polster (Anna-Lisa Ihalainen)
 Ritva Valkama (Miina)
 Sergey Filippov (Hyvärinen)
 Nina Grebeshkova (Hyvärinen's wife)
 Vera Ivleva (Anna-Kaisa)
 Galina Polskikh (Kaisa Karhutar)
 Mikhail Pugovkin (chief of Police)
 Kauko Helovirta (lieutenant Torvelainen)
 Olavi Ahonen (Ville Huttunen)
 Leonid Kuravlyov (peasant)
 Viktor Uralsky (peasant)

External links

1980 films
1980 comedy films
Russian comedy films
1980s Russian-language films
1980s Finnish-language films
Films shot in Finland
Films set in Finland
Films set in the 20th century
Films based on Finnish novels
Films based on works by Algot Untola
Films directed by Leonid Gaidai
Films scored by Aleksandr Zatsepin
Soviet comedy films
Soviet multilingual films
Finnish multilingual films
Finnish comedy films
1980 multilingual films
Russian-language Finnish films